The Southern California Mormon Choir is a choir based in Southern California that was formed in 1953 under the auspices of the Church of Jesus Christ of Latter-day Saints. The choir performs concerts of classical, sacred, folk, patriotic, and popular choral music throughout the Southern California area.

The choir was organized by H. Frederick Davis (1909-2000), a Tonga-born, New Zealand raised Latter-day Saint. The current director is Jan Bills, a professional harpist with a degree in music from Brigham Young University.

See also
 
 Culture of The Church of Jesus Christ of Latter-day Saints

References

External links
 

1953 establishments in California
Choirs in California
Latter Day Saint musical groups
Musical groups established in 1953
American Christian musical groups